HD 22676 (HR 1109) is a solitary star in the southern circumpolar constellation Mensa.

HD 22676 has a stellar classification of G8 III, which indicates that is an evolved late G-type giant star currently on the horizontal branch, specifically the red clump region. At an age of 700 million years, it has expanded to 9.33 times the radius of the Sun. It has 2.36 times the Sun's mass and radiates at approximately 58 times the luminosity of the Sun from its enlarged photosphere at an effective temperature of 5,109 K, which gives it a yellow glow.

References 

Mensa (constellation)
G-type giants
022676
016290
1109
Mensa, 1
Horizontal-branch stars
Durchmusterung objects